The 1894 Connecticut gubernatorial election was held on November 6, 1894. Republican nominee Owen Vincent Coffin defeated Democratic nominee Ernest Cady with 54.18% of the vote. Coffin defeated Samuel E. Merwin in the Republican primary.

General election

Candidates
Major party candidates
Owen Vincent Coffin, Republican
Ernest Cady, Democratic

Other candidates
DeWitt C. Pond, Prohibition
Edwin C. Bingham, People's
James F. Tuckey, Socialist Labor

Results

References

1894
Connecticut
Gubernatorial